Piar Municipality may refer to:

Piar Municipality, Bolívar
Piar Municipality, Monagas

Municipality name disambiguation pages